The Yarra River is a river in East-Central Victoria, Australia that flows through the city of Melbourne. This article contains explanations and lists of the river's tributaries and other geographic features. The river flows atop layers of silt that built up within an ancient river valley around 10,000-15,000 years ago.

The river's major tributaries are the Plenty River, Merri Creek, Darebin Creek, Diamond Creek, Gardiners Creek, Mullum Mullum Creek and the Moonee Ponds Creek. It hosts a wide range of geographic features including; bends, rapids, lakes, islands, floodplains, billabongs, wetlands, etc. Most features have been named after translated Woiwurrung phrases or have European, particularly British, origins.

The Yarra River has two other names ‘the upside down river’ and ‘Birrarung’. The Yarra was for say nicknamed the upside down river because of the way some of it looked. Birrarung was the very first name that the indigenous Australians gave it.

Tributaries

The Yarra River has about 50 named tributaries; 6 rivers, 42 creeks and 2 gullies. At its most easterly point, it is fed by many small unnamed creeks and streams that begin in the Yarra Ranges within the Yarra Ranges National Park, which are sometimes fed by snowfalls. Below is a list of its tributaries (from downstream to upstream):

Geographical features

The Yarra River hosts a wide range of geographical features, perhaps the most plentiful of which are billabongs, of which there are over 100, particularly in the floodplains near Yering, Yarra Glen and Coldstream. Being a considerably thin river for almost its entire length, there are very few islands or lakes. In the middle reaches there are a few rapids of easy to moderate difficulty, however these are sparsely distributed. Below is a list of the river's geographical features, including tributaries (shown in bold) and man-made features or townships (shown in italics), for bearings (from downstream to upstream):

 Entrance to Yarra River in Hobsons Bay
 West Gate Bridge
 Stony Creek
 Maribyrnong River
 Coode Island (created in 1880s)
 Fishermans Bend (created in 1880s)
 Moonee Ponds Creek
 Victoria Harbour (created in 1892)
 Batman's Hill (levelled in mid-19th century)
 Turning Basin
 Melbourne CBD
 Princes Bridge
 Birrarung Marr
 Ornamental Lake
 Punt Hill
 Herring Island
 Burnley Harbour & Wetlands
 Gardiners Creek
 Burnley Bend
 Hawthorn
 Yarra Bend (Ends)
 Dights Falls
 Merri Creek
 Galatea Point
 Studley Park Boathouse
 Flying Fox Lookout
 Fairfield Boathouse
 Yarra Bend (Begins)
 Kew Billabong
 Darebin Creek
 Glass Creek
 Yarra Flats (Ends)
 Koonung Creek
 Bolin Bolin Billabong (cut off in 1100)
 Annulus Billabong
 Salt Creek
 Sills Bend
 Heidelberg
 Yarra Flats (Begins)
 Banyule Creek
 Banyule Flats & Billabongs
 Plenty River
 Templestowe
 Ruffey Creek
 Kestrel Creek
 Westerfolds Rapids
 Fitzsimons Lane Bridge
 Diamond Creek
 Sweeneys Flats
 Mullum Mullum Creek
 Tikalara
 Pound Bend (Ends)
 Bobs Wetlands
 Pound Bend Tunnel
 Stony Creek
 Pound Bend (Begins)
 Andersons Creek
 Fourth Hill
 Whipstick Gully
 Warrandyte
 Scotchmans Hill
 The Island
 Parson Gully
 Black Flat
 Jumping Creek
 Blue Tongue Bend
 Warrandyte Gorge
 Pigeon Bank Gully
 Kangaroo Ground Rapids
 Watsons Creek
 Bend of Isles
 Moniques Island
 Brushy Creek
 Mount Lofty
 Bob's Rock
 Canoe Slalom Rapids
 Christmas Hills Rapids
 Yering Gorge
 Yering Billabongs
 Olinda Creek
 Yarra Glen
 Yarra Flats Billabongs
 Steels Creek
 Coldstream Flats & Billabongs
 Pauls Creek
 Healesville
 Watts River
 Badger Creek
 Warramate Hills
 Woori Yallock Creek
 Woori Yallock Flats & Billabong
 Ure Creek
 Launching Place
 Hoddles Creek
 Don River
 Little Yarra River
 Don Creek
 Yarra Junction
 Don Creek
 Platts Creek
 Frenchman Creek
 Yankee Jim Creek
 Dee River
 Scotchmans Creek
 Warburton
 Four Mile Creek
 Pheasant Creek
 Starling Creek
 Big Pats Creek
 Dead Horse Creek
 Cement Creek
 Braham Creek
 McDonald Creek
 Crooked Creek
 Starvation Creek
 Little Peninsula Tunnel
 Big Peninsula Tunnel
 McMahons Creek
 Upper Yarra Dam
 Upper Yarra Reservoir (created in 1957)
 Armstrong Creek
 Alderman Creek
 Walsh Creek
 Baker Creek
 Woods Creek
 Mmbw Channel

See also
Geology of Victoria
Crossings of the Yarra River

References

Lists of river tributaries
Yarra River